Amos O'Neal is an American Democratic politician who represents Michigan’s 94th district in the Michigan House of Representatives, serving the city of Saginaw and parts of Saginaw Township. O’Neal is the Democratic Caucus Chair for the 2023-24 legislative session.

References 

Living people
Year of birth missing (living people)
Democratic Party members of the Michigan House of Representatives
21st-century American politicians
African-American state legislators in Michigan
21st-century African-American politicians